Bah Chu Mei (born 27 August 1960) is a former Malaysian international lawn bowler.

Bowls career
Bah Chu Mei has represented Malaysia at three Commonwealth Games; in the pairs event at the 1998 Commonwealth Games, the fours event at the 2002 Commonwealth Games and the pairs event at the 2006 Commonwealth Games.

She won two bronze medals at the 2001 Asia Pacific Bowls Championships, in Melbourne and won three gold medals at the Lawn bowls at the Southeast Asian Games.

After the 2006 Commonwealth Games she became a bowls coach.

References

External links
 

1960 births
Living people
Bowls players at the 1998 Commonwealth Games
Bowls players at the 2002 Commonwealth Games
Bowls players at the 2006 Commonwealth Games
Malaysian female bowls players
Southeast Asian Games medalists in lawn bowls
Competitors at the 1999 Southeast Asian Games
Competitors at the 2001 Southeast Asian Games
Competitors at the 2005 Southeast Asian Games
Southeast Asian Games gold medalists for Malaysia
21st-century Malaysian women